"Sticker" is a song recorded by South Korean boy group NCT 127 for their third studio album of the same name. Composed by frequent production group and collaborator Dem Jointz, Calixthe, Prince Chapelle, Ryan S. Jhun and Yoo Young-jin with lyrical composition by the latter, member Taeyong and Mark, the "experimental" hip-hop track was released digitally on September 17, 2021 as the lead single from the album by SM Entertainment. An accompanying music video was released on the same release date, which depicts a "futuristic/space cowboy" concept. 

"Sticker" became the group's second top-five hit on the Gaon Digital Chart, while becoming their eleventh top-five entry on the US World Digital Song Sales chart. It is also NCT 127's first entry on the Global 200 chart, where it peaked at number 101. "Sticker" achieved ten wins in South Korean music programs, becoming the most-awarded song by NCT 127 and by an NCT sub-unit.

Background 
"Sticker" was composed by Dem Jointz, Calixthe, Prince Chapelle, Ryan S. Jhun, Yoo Young-jin, while production was handled by Lee Soo-man. Dem Jointz had also co-produced NCT 127's previous singles "Cherry Bomb," "Kick It," and "Punch." The song features a prominent flute sound and a "minimal" and "subdued" production. The group found the song surprising and difficult to master. Member and co-lyricist Taeyong noted in a behind-the-scenes video that he felt that he was "being punished" and "rebuked" for a song for the first time due to its difficulty in pulling off the song. Member and vocalist Doyoung shared it was their first time where they "dived deep" with Yoo Young-jin while recording the song, with Yoo encouraging the group's rappers Taeyong and Mark to write the song's rap lyrics to "bring out the NCT vibe" with the group in mind. In an interview on The Travis Mills Show, member Johnny said listeners can expect to be surprised with the flute melody, while Mark described it as a song that "has a lot of impact and a lot of dynamics" that they have "never touched before." Dem Jointz attributed the song's odd structure to “just being different. You want to stand out, but at the end of the day, you still want everybody to get what you’re doing." He also added that the flute sound "makes you get down and boogie." He ultimately called it one of his favorite tracks, saying that he "feels as strong about this record as I do [for] 'Kick It.'"

Commercial performance
In South Korea, the song debuted at number 17 on the Gaon Digital Chart for the issue dated October 12–18, 2021 and peaked at number 5 in its second week. It also debuted at number 1 both on the component Download Chart and on the component BGM Chart. The song also debuted at number 144 on the component Streaming Chart and peaked at number 37 in its second week. The song debuted at number 25 on the Billboard's K-pop Hot 100 chart for the issue dated October 2, 2021. In Japan, the song debuted at number 55 on the Billboard Japan Hot 100 chart for the issue dated October 2, 2021. In Singapore, the song debuted at number 16 on the RIAS's Top Regional Chart for the issue dated September 17–23, 2021. In the United States, the song debuted at number 5 on the Billboard World Digital Song Sales chart for the issue dated October 2, 2021. It also debuted at number 101 on the Billboard Global 200 for the issue dated October 2, 2021 and at number 53 on the Billboard Global Excl. US for the issue dated October 2, 2021. In Singapore, the song debuted at number 16 on the RIAS's Top Regional Chart in the chart issue dated September 17–23, 2021.

Music video 
The music video for "Sticker" was released at 13:00 KST on September 17, 2021, alongside the single and album release. The high-budget music video depicts a "futuristic/space cowboy" concept with colorful set designs, use of CGI, camerawork transitions, and the members singing and dancing throughout different sets. The set is noted for its city-style, video game elements, and use of neon lights accompanied by CGI, which NME describes as "Las Vegas-esque." On YouTube, "Sticker" became the fastest music video by an SM Entertainment artist to surpass 1 million views, which it achieved in only 21 minutes, despite its 13:00 KST release when most fans from Asia are still at school or work. It also surpassed 27 million views and 1.4 million likes within 24 hours, breaking the record for the second most-viewed NCT music video in the first 24 hours at the time, and the most for NCT 127, until the release of "2 Baddies" in 2022.

Credits and personnel 
Credits adapted from the liner notes of Sticker.

Studio 
 Recorded, digitally edited, engineered for mix, and mixed at SM Booming System
 Mastered at Sonic Korea

Personnel 
 SM Entertainment – executive producer
 Lee Soo-man – producer
 NCT 127 – vocals
 Taeyong – lyrics
 Mark – lyrics
 Yoo Young-jin – producer, lyrics, composition, arrangement, vocal directing, background vocals, recording, mixing, digital editing, engineered for mix, music and sound supervisor
 Prince Chapelle – composition, background vocals
 Calixte – composition, background vocals
 Dem Jointz – composition, arrangement
 Ryan S. Jhun – composition, arrangement
 Shin Soo-min – mastering assistant
 Jeon Hoon – mastering

Accolades

Charts

Weekly charts

Monthly charts

Release history

References 

2021 singles
2021 songs
NCT 127 songs
SM Entertainment singles
Songs written by Ryan S. Jhun
Songs written by Yoo Young-jin